"A Simple Desultory Philippic (Or How I Was Robert McNamara'd Into Submission)" is a song written by American singer-songwriter Paul Simon. Originally recorded for Simon's 1965 UK-only debut, The Paul Simon Songbook, it was recorded soon after by Simon and his partner, Art Garfunkel, for the duo's third album Parsley, Sage, Rosemary and Thyme.

It is generally considered a parody of American musician Bob Dylan's writing style, especially that of "Subterranean Homesick Blues", released on Dylan's 1965 album Bringing It All Back Home. The original version was subtitled "Or how I was Lyndon Johnson'd into Submission" in a spoken introduction at the beginning, after Simon announced the song's title. The subtitle does not appear on the sleeve or the disc label.  "Desultory" means lacking in consistency, disconnected, random and a philippic is a fiery, damning speech, or tirade, delivered to condemn a particular political actor.

Recording history
Simon's original, solo performance found on The Paul Simon Songbook is less well known than Simon & Garfunkel's; the album remained out of print until 2004, when it was re-released by Columbia/Legacy.

In early 1965, Simon was in the midst of a period in which he went back and forth between the United States and Great Britain. Eventually spending most of 1965 in Britain, he recorded The Paul Simon Songbook in London, while making a living singing at folk clubs in Britain. During this period he was also writing with Bruce Woodley of the Seekers. The album's liner notes by Judith Piepe, state of the song: "This is, of course, a take-off, a take-on, a private joke, but no joke is all that private or any less serious for being a joke."

In 1966, together with Art Garfunkel, Simon re-recorded the song for the duo's album Parsley, Sage, Rosemary and Thyme, with several changes to the lyrics. The list of names dropped is revised.

Lyrics

Bob Dylan references
When Simon complains about a man who is, "...so unhip, when you say Dylan he thinks you're talking about Dylan Thomas," the next line in the London solo version is "It's all right Ma. It's just something I learned over in England," referencing the Dylan songs "It's Alright, Ma (I'm Only Bleeding)" and "I Shall Be Free No. 10." However, the Simon and Garfunkel song says, "It's all right Ma. Everybody must get stoned." the second part referencing the Dylan song "Rainy Day Women No. 12 & 35". There is another potential Dylan reference in the line "I just discovered somebody's tapped my phone," possibly alluding to "Subterranean Homesick Blues" where Dylan sings that "the phone's tapped anyway." In the 1965 original, the line was "Barry Kornfeld's mother's on the phone." 

At the end of the 1966 recording Simon says, "Folk rock," and, after an audible noise, "I've lost my harmonica, Albert." This presumably refers to Dylan's manager, Albert Grossman. In the 1965 version, however, Simon sings, "When in London, do as I do: find yourself a friendly haiku... Go to sleep for ten or fifteen years." This could be a reference to Simon's girlfriend at that time, Kathy Chitty, whom people referred to as 'The Haiku'.

People mentioned in lyrics
In 1965:
Lyndon Johnson, President of the United States (1963–1969)
Union Jack, flag of the United Kingdom
Jack Kerouac, American novelist
John Birch, American Baptist missionary and martyr; namesake of American politically right-wing John Birch Society active in that period
Larry Adler, noted harmonica player
Walt Disney, American film producer
Diz Disley, British jazz guitarist
John Lennon, member of The Beatles
Krishna Menon, Indian politician
Walter Brennan, American actor
Cassius Clay, American boxer, later known as Muhammad Ali
James Joyce, Irish writer and poet
Rolls-Royce British luxury car maker
Tom Wilson, record producer who produced several of Bob Dylan's '60s LPs, Simon & Garfunkel's début album, and the electric version of "The Sound of Silence"
Barry Kornfeld, second guitarist on Simon and Garfunkel's Wednesday Morning, 3 A.M. album

In 1966:
Norman Mailer, American writer
Maxwell Taylor, American soldier and diplomat
John O'Hara, American writer
Robert McNamara, American political figure (U.S. Secretary of Defense at the time)
Phil Spector, record producer
Lou Adler, record producer
Barry Sadler, U.S. Army Green Beret and American musician
Roy Halee, Simon and Garfunkel's record producer

In both:
The Rolling Stones, British rock group
The Beatles, British pop and rock group
Ayn Rand, novelist and philosopher
Art Garfunkel, American singer, Paul Simon's partner in Simon and Garfunkel
Dylan Thomas, Welsh poet and writer - as opposed to Bob Dylan, American singer and songwriter 
Lenny Bruce, American comedian
Mick Jagger, frontman of The Rolling Stones
"Silver Dagger", nineteenth-century folk song largely associated with Joan Baez
Andy Warhol, American visual artist

References

Simon & Garfunkel songs
Songs written by Paul Simon
1965 songs
Song recordings produced by Bob Johnston
Songs about Bob Dylan